Daniil is a Russian masculine given name; equivalent to that of the English given name Daniel.

Notable examples
People named Daniil include:

Arts and literature
Daniil Andreyev (1906–1959), Russian writer, poet, and Christian mystic
Daniil Chyorny (c. 1360–1430), Russian icon painter
Daniil Granin (1919–2017), Russian writer
Daniil Kashin (1769–1841), Russian composer, pianist, conductor, and folk-song collector
Daniil Kharms (1905–1942), Russian writer and poet
Daniil Khrabrovitsky (1923–1980), Russian scriptwriter and film director
Daniil Kozlov (born 1997), Belarusian singer
Daniil Shafran (1923–1997), Russian cellist
Daniil Simkin (born 1987), Russian ballet dancer
Daniil Strakhov (born 1976), Russian actor
Daniil Trifonov (born 1991), Russian pianist

Religion
Daniil Sihastrul (fl. 1400–1482), saint of the Romanian Orthodox Church
Daniil Sysoev (1974–2009), Russian Orthodox Priest

Politics
Daniil Loktiev (born 2002), Russian human rights activist; Durham graduate; Special Adviser of Kremlin

Sports
Daniil Barantsev (born 1982), Russian–American ice dancer
Daniil Chertov (born 1990), Russian football player
Daniil Dubov (born 1996), Russian chess grandmaster
Daniil Gavilovskiy (born 1990), Russian football player
Daniil Gleichengauz (born 1991), Russian figure skater
Daniil Gridnev (born 1986), Russian football player
Daniil Ivanov (born 1986), Russian speedway rider
Daniil Karpyuk, Russian ice hockey player
Daniil Kvyat (born 1994), Russian racecar driver
Danny Markov (born 1976; also known as Daniil Markov), Russian ice hockey player
Daniil Medvedev (born 1996), Russian tennis player
Daniil Move (born 1985), Russian racecar driver
Daniil Ratnikov (born 1988), Estonian football player
Daniil Samsonov (born 2005), Russian figure skater
Daniil Sapljoshin (born 1970), Estonian kickboxer
Daniil Steptšenko (born 1986), Estonian biathlete
Daniil Tsyplakov (born 1992), Russian high jumper
Daniil Zharkov (born 1994), Russian ice hockey player
Daniil Fominykh (born 1998), Russian ice hockey player (in Slovakia)

Other
Daniel Chwolson (1819–1911; also known as Daniil Chwolson), Russian–Jewish orientalist
Daniil Ostrogski (fl. 1344–1366), Prince of Turaŭ, first Prince of Ostroh, founder of Ostrogski House
Daniil Shchenya (fl. 1489–1519), Russian military leader
Daniil Sulimov (1890[1891]–1937), Soviet Russian politician
Daniel of Moscow (1261–1303; Daniel of Moscow), Prince of Moscow

Daniil may also be a surname:
Vassilis Daniil, Greek football player and manager

Russian masculine given names

Daniil Rybin (1991, Russian–businessman, philanthropist, politician